Cashapampa District is one of ten districts of the Sihuas Province in the Ancash Region of northern Peru.

References

Districts of the Sihuas Province
Districts of the Ancash Region